Albert Franz Doppler (16 October 182127 July 1883), was a flute virtuoso and a composer best known for his flute music. He also wrote one German and several Hungarian operas for Budapest, all produced with great success. His ballet music was popular during his lifetime.

Life
Doppler was born in Lemberg (Austrian Empire), now Lviv, Ukraine. From 1828 to 1831, he received flute lessons from his father, Joseph Doppler, who was an oboist, and made his debut as a flautist at the age of 13. He formed a flute duo with his brother Karl, four years younger, who mainly wrote songs and incidental music, and as a duo they caused quite a sensation throughout Europe. They toured and both became members of the orchestra of the German Theatre, Budapest, in 1838 and both moved to the Hungarian National Theatre in 1841. There, five of Franz's operas were staged with success. Franz and Karl continued to make regular tours of Europe and helped found the Hungarian Philharmonic Orchestra in 1853. At the age of 18 Franz was the first flautist at the opera in Budapest, and he went on to be the first flautist and stand-in conductor, and eventually chief conductor, of the Vienna Court Opera, as well as acquiring a position of Professor of Flute at the Vienna Conservatoire from 1864 until 1867. He died in Baden bei Wien, Austria.

Doppler composed chiefly for the flute, as well as opera (a style that is prominent even in his showpieces for flute), composing many pieces including concertos, showpieces, and many flute duets, to be played by himself and his brother Karl. His music contains aspects of Russian and Hungarian music. His operas included Judith (his only German opera), and a Russian work entitled Benyovsky. He wrote seven operas and fifteen ballets in total (which were quite popular in their time) and was a brilliant orchestrator.

He is also known for the orchestral arrangements of six of Franz Liszt's Hungarian Rhapsodies published under his name. He was a student of Liszt, and Liszt set Doppler the exercise of orchestrating six Rhapsodies.  Every single bar of these orchestrations was revised by Liszt upon publication, but he allowed Doppler's name to remain on the title page. (Liszt frequently collaborated with his students in this way which gave rise to the notion that he did not or could not orchestrate his own works)

Selected works 
 Stage works
 Benyovszky vagy A kamcsatkai számuzött (Benyovsky, or the Changeling from Kamchatka), opera after August von Kotzebue, 1847
 Ilka és a huszártoborzó (Ilka and the Hussar Recruitment), comic opera, 1849
 Wanda, opera, 1853
 Két huszár (The Two Hussars), opera, 1853
 Salvator Rosa, melodrama, 1855
 Erzsébet opera, (Overture and Act I. Act II by Ferenc Erkel, Act III by Karl Doppler), 1857
 Judith opera, 1870

 Other
 Airs Valaques, Op. 10
 Berceuse, Op. 15
 Mazurka de salon, Op. 16
 Nocturne, Op. 17
 Andante et Rondo, Op. 25 (for two flutes and a piano) 1870
 Fantaisie pastorale hongroise, Op. 26
 Souvenir du Rigi, Op. 34

References 
 Zoltán Gárdonyi, (Albert) Franz [Ferenc] Doppler in The New Grove Dictionary of Music and Musicians edited by Stanley Sadie, volume 7, pp. 502–503

External links 
 

1821 births
1883 deaths
Musicians from Lviv
Austro-Hungarian people
19th-century classical composers
19th-century classical musicians
Austrian classical flautists
Austrian Romantic composers
Austrian opera composers
Male opera composers
Austrian male classical composers
19th-century male musicians
20th-century flautists